Paul Joseph Alphonse Gauthier (December 8, 1915 – March 10, 1984) was a Canadian professional ice hockey goaltender who played in one National Hockey League game for the Montreal Canadiens during the 1937–38 NHL season. He was the lightest goalie to ever play in the NHL, weighing in at 125 lbs.

See also
List of players who played only one game in the NHL

References

External links

1915 births
1984 deaths
Buffalo Bisons (AHL) players
Canadian ice hockey goaltenders
Cleveland Barons (1937–1973) players
Houston Huskies players
Kansas City Greyhounds players
Montreal Canadiens players
New Haven Eagles players
Omaha Knights (USHL) players
Philadelphia Rockets players
Pittsburgh Shamrocks players
Ice hockey people from Winnipeg
Washington Lions players
Canadian ice hockey goaltender stubs
Ice hockey people from Manitoba